The Marwari or Marwadi are an Indian ethnic group that originate from the Marwar region of Rajasthan, India. Their language, also called Marwari, comes under the umbrella of Rajasthani languages, which is part of the Western Zone of Indo-Aryan languages.

They have been a highly successful business community, first as inland traders during the era of Rajput kingdoms, and later also as investors in industrial production and other sectors. Today, they control many of the country's largest media groups. Although spread throughout India, historically they have been most concentrated in Kolkata, Mumbai, Chennai, Delhi, Nagpur, Pune and the hinterlands of central and eastern India.

Etymology
The term Marwari once referred to the area encompassed by the former princely state of Marwar, also called the Jodhpur region of southwest Rajasthan in India. The Jodhpur region includes the present districts of Barmer, Jalore, Jodhpur, Nagaur, Churu, Pali and parts of Sikar. It has evolved to be a designation for the Rajasthani people in general but it is used particularly with reference to certain jātis that fall within the Bania community.  The most prominent among these communities, are the Agrawals, Khandelwals, Maheshwaris and Oswals. It is possible that the association of the Marwari term with Jodhpur owes more to the high status of that place in pre-independence India.

Dwijendra Tripathi believes that the term Marwari was probably used by the traders only when they were outside their home region; that is, by the diaspora. Anne Hardgrove also supports this argument, saying that the Marwari identity could only exist in the context of a diaspora who came from somewhere and that until they migrated they had no such designation.

History

Early origins
Marwari traders have historically been migratory in habit. The possible causes of this trait include the proximity of their homeland to the major Ganges - Yamuna trade route; movement to escape famine; and the encouragement given to them by various rulers of northern India who saw advantages in having their skills in banking and finance.

The pattern of Marwari migration became increasingly divergent following the decline in wars between Rajput kingdoms, which the Marwaris had helped to finance, and the decreasing influence of the community over the North Indian caravan trading routes that resulted from the British establishing themselves in the region. The changed focus of migration was also encouraged by the British, who established or patronised new trading routes and centres, as well as by the decline in the political significance of the Rajput courts whose famed conspicuous consumption had been supported by Marwari money. The community welcomed the relative safety that the British presence offered, as well as the commercial and legal frameworks that they provided and which were more favourable to Marwari activities than the systems prevalent during the earlier period of Mughal and Rajput rule.

The Marwari Jagat Seth family served as banker to the Nawab of Bengal.

British era
After the decline of Mughal authority, Marwari traders, bankers and financiers migrated to the growing British power in Calcutta. There were particularly significant population shifts to Bombay between 1835-1850 and Kolkata from the 1870s, as well as to Madras.  

Historian Medha M. Kudaisya has said that the Marwaris:

A considerable number of Marwari business groups made their fortune on speculative markets in the nineteenth and early twentieth century.

Although maintaining close and public ties with the British authorities, members of the Marwari business community were early financial supporters of the Indian National Congress, often in secret.

Independent India
In 1956, the All-India Marwari Federation opposed a linguistic organisation of states whilst buying up regional language newspapers in Maharashtra, Tamil Nadu and Andhra Pradesh. Today, they control many of the country's largest media groups.

The community's influence over the Indian economy declined following the country's 1991 economic reforms. From a peak of controlling 24 per cent of economic activity in 1990, it had fallen to less than 2 per cent in 2000. This reflects the growth of new industries outside of commodities trading and primary production. The figure for 2000 is considered to be lower than the position in 1939, when the community first began its resurgence.

Language
Marwari, or Marrubhasha, as it is referred to by Marwaris, is the traditional, historical, language of the Marwari ethnicity. The Marwari language is closely related to the Rajasthani language. The latter evolved from the Old Gujarati (also called Old Western Rajasthani, Gujjar Bhakha or Maru-Gurjar), language spoken by the people in Gujarat and Rajasthan. It has been noted that throughout the state of Rajasthan, people avoid identifying their language by name, preferring to identify themselves as speaking "Rajasthani" with Marwari literature and taught as Rajasthani until secondary level.

Culture 
Marwaris have been known for a tightly knit social solidarity, described by Selig Harrison in 1960 as "indissoluble under the impact of the strongest regional solvents". According to Hardgrove, "The main duty for Marwari women, it would seem, is to provide a stable household life for their husbands, sons and brothers-in-law", although she acknowledges that some such women have in recent years been attempting to carve out roles in the wider world through engagement in charitable ventures and even running their own businesses.

Notable people

Anil Agarwal
Ritesh Agarwal
Sanjay Agarwal
Nidhhi Agerwal
Janaki Devi Bajaj
Rahul Bajaj
Benu Gopal Bangur
Sooraj Barjatya
Tarachand Barjatya
Shobhana Bhartia
Aditya Vikram Birla
Kumar Mangalam Birla
Om Birla
Kishore Biyani
Binod Chaudhary

Ritu Dalmia
Jagmohan Dalmiya
Radhakishan Damani
Harsh Goenka
Pawan Goenka
Rama Prasad Goenka
S. N. Goenka
Desh Bandhu Gupta
Abhishek Jain
Ravi Jaipuria
Shyamanand Jalan
Rakesh Jhunjhunwala
Rajeev Khandelwal
Rohit Khandelwal
Mangal Prabhat Lodha
Shailesh Lodha, actor, writer and poet
Mohan Lal Lohia
Smriti Mandhana
Lakshmi Mittal
Palak Muchhal
Hanuman Prasad Poddar
Shashi and Ravi Ruia
Kiku Sharda 
Lala Kamlapat Singhania
Abhishek Singhvi
Ashok Kumar Singhvi
Laxmi Mall Singhvi

See also
 Tarachand Ghanshyamdas
 Marwari Muslims
 Karmveer Choudhary

References

External links

 
Rajasthani people
Ethnic groups in India
Indo-Aryan peoples